Wushu was contested by both men and women at the 2014 Asian Games in Incheon, South Korea from September 20 to 24, 2014. All events were held at the Ganghwa Dolmens Gymnasium.

Schedule

Medalists

Men's taolu

Men's sanda

Women's taolu

Women's sanda

Medal table

Participating nations
A total of 190 athletes from 29 nations competed in wushu at the 2014 Asian Games:

References

External links
Official website

 
2014
Asian Games
2014 Asian Games events